Shaheed Raghunath Mahato (21 March 1738 – 5 April 1778) was an Indian revolutionary and a leader of the Chuar rebellion from the Kudmi Mahato community. He led a revolt against the East India Company in 1769.

Overview 
Raghunath Mahato was born on 21 March 1738 in ghutiadih village of Nimdih block of Saraikela Khorsoya District.

The Rebellion against British was known as Chuar rebellion. Chuar means looter. When British started to collect taxes in 1765 when they won Battle of Buxar and got rights to collect taxes from Bihar and Bengal. But people opposed it as People thought British were depriving their rights. Some Jamindar joined British while other rebeled against them. In 1769, Raghunath Mahato led Kudmi Mahato people against British. His slogan was:... "Apna Gaon, Apna Raj; Dur Bhagaw Bideshi Raj". The folklore sing by Lodha people is like:... "Kesu Aarir Fansi hailo, Raghunath Mahto Bandaigelo, Bansbone Dom hailo Kana, Rage Jalchche Jangal Mahal Thana."When British asked the Jamindar about identity of rebels, Jamindar said the rebelious people are Chuar means looter, thieves, nasty people, barbarian, uncivilized, and arrogant. The people who rebeled were belongs to many ethnic groups such as Kudmi Mahato, Bagdi, Bhumij, Bauri, and other communities.

On 5 April 1778, Raghunath Mahato and his team who were planning to snacht weapons of British forces in forest. In this skirmish Raghunath Mahato and several other rebel died fighting British forces.

References

1738 births
1778 deaths
Indian independence activists
Social workers